Plectromerus dominicanus is a species of beetle in the family Cerambycidae. It was described by Micheli in 1983.

References

Cerambycinae
Beetles described in 1983